Fiona Fussi (born 25 January 1996) is an Singaporean-Austrian fashion model. She is a celebrity model in Singapore and is best known for being the winner of Elite Model Look Singapore 2011.

Modelling career
In 2011, at the age of 15, Fiona won Elite Model Look Singapore 2011. She then represented Singapore in Elite Model Look International 2011 held in Shanghai, China.

In 2012, Fiona was the face of Audi Fashion Festival, a major fashion event in Singapore.

In 2014, Fiona became the first model ambassador from Singapore to represent global beauty brand L'Oreal Paris in Asia. L'Oreal Paris has always been using celebrity endorsement in Asia.

In 2016, Fiona became the ambassador of Acuvue Define in Asia.

 Fiona has also appeared in TV commercials for Darlie, Hang Seng Bank, LG Electronics and HKT. She has also appeared in a series of makeup and skin care tutorial for Chanel and Clarins.

She is currently represented by Singapore modelling agency, Basic Models Management.

She was appeared in TV commercials for LG Electronics' OLED TV in 2018

References

External links
 

1996 births
Living people
Austrian female models
Singaporean female models
Singaporean people of Austrian descent
Singaporean people of Hong Kong descent
People educated at a United World College